Ramaria rasilispora, commonly known as the yellow coral, is a coral mushroom in the family Gomphaceae. Described as new to science in 1974, it is found in western North America south to Mexico, and in the eastern Himalaya.

Taxonomy
The species was first described scientifically in 1974 by American mycologists Currie Marr and Daniel Stuntz. The specific epithet rasilispora is derived from the roots rasil- (shaved, scraped, or worn smooth) and spora (spore). It is commonly known as the "yellow coral".

Description

The branches are smooth and cream to pale yellow in color, except in young specimens that lack coloration. The context is fleshy to fibrous, but when dry has a consistency similar to bendable chalk. In young fruit bodies, the stipe and lower branches are whitish to light yellowish. Upper branches are light orange to apricot-yellow, maturing to a pale grayish-orange. Branch tips are initially the same color as the branch, but darken to brown in maturity or when dry. Fruit bodies have no distinctive taste or odor.

Spores are cylindrical, with a surface texture ranging from smooth to finely warted, and measure 8–11 by 3–4 μm. The basidia (spore-bearing cells) are club-shaped, two- to four-spored (most have four spores), and measure 47–60 by 8–10 μm.

The variety Ramaria rasilispora var. scatesina differs from the main type in the color of its fruit bodies, which, in both young and mature specimens, have branches that range from yellowish-white to light yellow.

The fruit bodies are edible, and "quite popular" according to David Arora, who reports its use raw in salads, or candied like grapefruit rinds. Some people report a negative reaction to eating the mushroom. The fungi are sold in traditional markets in the Mexican municipalities of Ozumba and Chalco.

Similar species 
Similar species include Ramaria flavigelatinosa and R. magnipes, the latter of which is close in appearance to var. rasilispora.

Habitat and distribution
The fruit bodies of Ramaria rasilispora grow on the ground in coniferous forests. Fruiting occurs in spring and summer. Common in western North America, its range extends south to Mexico and north to Alaska. Variety rasilispora is found in the Pacific Northwest. Variety scatesina, originally collected in coniferous forests of Idaho, has since been reported growing in a deciduous forest in the eastern Himalaya.

References

Gomphaceae
Edible fungi
Fungi described in 1974
Fungi of Asia
Fungi of North America